Julie Mason (born 11 December 1966) is a journalist and the host of "Julie Mason Mornings." Previously, she hosted "The Press Pool" on SiriusXM radio's POTUS channel.

Professional life

Mason was a White House correspondent for the Houston Chronicle, Washington Examiner and Politico during the George W. Bush administration and the first term of Barack Obama's administration. She was with the Chronicle for twenty years.

Mason's first job was as a clerk in the Washington bureau of the Dallas Morning News, and In 1988 she went to Texas to work as a reporter with the Houston Chronicle. She was transferred to the newspaper's Washington bureau in 2001 but was laid off in 2008 while serving as the paper's White House correspondent. She worked at the Washington Examiner as a White House reporter until 2010,  when she joined Politico's White House team. She joined SiriusXM in 2011. In 2014, Mason received the Gracie Award from the Alliance for Women in the Media for outstanding achievement as a radio talk show host. She has been the secretary and a board member of the White House Correspondents' Association.

She has been noted for her impressions of notable figures such as Laura Bush, Michelle Obama, Elizabeth Warren and John Boehner. Readers of FishbowlDC in 2012 voted Mason "class clown" of the Washington press corps.

One report said that Mason is known for her "bawdy personality and quick wit." Television commentator Bill O'Reilly in 2014 called her a "loon" because, according to him, she suggested that he and Glenn Beck may have damaged the Fox News "brand."

In 2011, White House press secretary Jay Carney called one of Mason's stories "partisan, inflammatory and tendentious," and U.S. National Security Council spokesperson Tommy Vietor sent her an e-mail that included an animated picture of a crying mime, a "visual suggestion that she was whining," according to Washington Post columnist Paul Farhi.

Personal life

Mason grew up in Acton, Massachusetts, graduated from Lawrence Academy at Groton, Massachusetts, and attended American University in Washington, D.C.

In May, 1996, she married David Messina of Houston in the Graceland Chapel in Las Vegas, Nevada, where a Presley impersonator walked her down the aisle and serenaded her afterward.

In 2011, she lived in Washington, in the Dupont-Logan-U Street-Columbia Heights area.

Mason and Alper Tunga Yakupoglu were married in October 2019 in the National Building Museum, Washington, D.C.

Mason is a reader of Tarot cards.

Quotations

 Tara Parker-Pope recalled that when she and Mason were reporters on the Houston Chronicle, the former stopped by Mason's desk to ask a question. Mason turned around "to show me I had her full attention" and said, "I've always got five minutes for a friend."
 Laura Bush was the "iron rod" at George W. Bush's back. "She keeps him from going too far off the deep end when he gets all caught up in his cock-of-the-walk behavior."

References

External links

 Mason prepares for a White House Correspondents Association dinner (video)

 "Jared Rizzi on President Obama and Julie's Ex-Husband," SiriusXM News and Issues, 2015 (video)
 "Julie Mason Is Getting Sirius," Borderstan, December 19, 2012 (transcript of interview)
 "Discussing inflation creating a pay cut for our troops: Ferrari on SiriusXM’s ‘Julie Mason Mornings,'American Enterprise Institute, November 18, 2021

Year of birth missing (living people)
Living people
People from Acton, Massachusetts
American political journalists
American women journalists
People from Washington, D.C.
21st-century American journalists
20th-century American journalists
American University alumni
20th-century American women
21st-century American women